Coralliophilla Monodonta is a species of sea snail, a marine gastropod mollusk in the family Muricidae, the murex snails or rock snails.

Description
The shell size varies between 16 mm and 35 mm. The outside of the shell is an off-white color and the inside has a deep purple color

Distribution
Coralliophilla Monodonta can be found naturally in Mozambique, New Zealand, Natal and the Marquesas Islands and was introduced as an alien into the Italian part of the Adriatic Sea. They can also be found in the Eastern Basin of the Mediterranean sea.
 Blainville H.M.D. de. (1832). Disposition méthodique des espèces récentes et fossiles des genres Pourpre, Ricinule, Licorne et Concholepas de M. de Lamarck, et description des espèces nouvelles ou peu connues, faisant partie de la collection du Muséum d'Histoire Naturelle de Paris. Nouvelles Annales du Muséum d'Histoire Naturelle. 1: 189-263, pls 9-12
 Odhner, N.H.J. (1919). Contribution a la faune malacologique de Madagascar. Arkiv For Zoologi, K. Svenska Vetenskapsakademien 12(6). 52 pp, 4 pl.
 Sheppard, A (1984). The molluscan fauna of Chagos (Indian Ocean) and an analysis of its broad distribution patterns. Coral Reefs 3: 43–50
 Abbott, R.T. & S.P. Dance (1986). Compendium of sea shells. American Malacologists, Inc:Melbourne, Florida
 Steyn, D.G & Lussi, M. (2005). Offshore Shells of Southern Africa: A pictorial guide to more than 750 Gastropods. Published by the authors. Pp. i–vi, 1–289.
 Oliverio M. (2008) Coralliophilinae (Neogastropoda: Muricidae) from the southwest Pacific. In: V. Héros, R.H. Cowie & P. Bouchet (eds), Tropical Deep-Sea Benthos 25. Mémoires du Muséum National d'Histoire Naturelle 196: 481–585. page(s): 507
 Marshall B.A. & Oliverio M. 2009. The Recent Coralliophilinae of the New Zealand region, with descriptions of two new species (Gastropoda: Neogastropoda: Muricidae). Molluscan Research 29: 155-173

External links
 
 Sowerby, G. B., I. (1821-1834). The genera of recent and fossil shells, for the use of students, in conchology and geology. Published in 42 numbers. Vol. 1, pls 1-126 [1821-1825; vol. 2, pls 127-262 + text]
 Quoy J.R.C. & Gaimard J.P. (1832-1835). Voyage de découvertes de l'"Astrolabe" exécuté par ordre du Roi, pendant les années 1826-1829, sous le commandement de M. J. Dumont d'Urville. Zoologie. 1: i-l, 1-264; 2(1): 1-321 [1832; 2(2): 321-686 [1833]; 3(1): 1-366 [1834]; 3(2): 367-954 [1835]; Atlas (Mollusques): pls 1-93 [1833]. Paris: Tastu]
 Katsanevakis, S.; Bogucarskis, K.; Gatto, F.; Vandekerkhove, J.; Deriu, I.; Cardoso A.S. (2012). Building the European Alien Species Information Network (EASIN): a novel approach for the exploration of distributed alien species data. BioInvasions Records. 1: 235-245

Coralliophila
Gastropods described in 1832